Naresh Kamboj ( (born 27 May 1964) is an Indian politician, a leader of the Indian National Congress and the currently member of Debt Conciliation Board, Govt. of Haryana. He became the member of Haryana Environment Protection Council for the first time in June 2006. In January 2007 he was appointed as the member of Debt Conciliation Board, Govt. of Haryana.

Early life
Naresh Kamboj was born to Chaudhry Kishori Lal Kamboj, a renowned personality, in the village of Fatehpur in then Ambala district of Haryana, India which is now a part of Yamuna Nagar. His grandfather Chaudhry Kundan Lal Kamboj was also a known social activist in Ambala district.
He is an alumnus of Mukand Lal National College. He did his B.A. at Kurukshetra University, Kurukshetra.

Political career
Kamboj was born in a political family. His father was a respected Congress leader of Yamuna Nagar and was Sarpanch, Nambardaar as well as member of the Block Samiti. This encouraged him to join the politics. He got first taste of politics while studying in MLN College where he became the president of NSUI and later on he was elected as the president of Student's Union of the only college in the district in year 1982–1983. This victory gave a kickstart to his political career. In year 1991 he was elected as the Sarpanch of Gram Panchayat Fatehpur. In year 1991 he was elected as the member of Block Samiti, Jagadhri. Being a son of an farmer he started working for the welfare of farmers and subsequently became the president of district wing of Kisan Sangharsh Samiti and in 1996 he was spotted by the future Chief minister of Haryana Bhupinder Singh Hooda who urged him to join mainstream politics and appointed him as Block president, Chhachhrauli of Haryana Congress Committee as well as Senior Vice President of District Congress Committee, Yamuna Nagar.
In 2000 Haryana Assembly elections, then State Congress Chief Hooda gave him the ticket from Chhachhrauli Legislative seat. But he lost the election by a considerable margin. Even after the defeat Hooda continued to show faith in him and in year 2002 appointed him as the Vice President of Haryana Kisan Khet Mazdoor Congress. In 2005 elections he was not given the ticket from Chhachhhrauli due to the re-emergence of Bhajan Lal in the congress. But subsequently Hooda was appointed as the Chief Minister of Haryana. And he repaid him for his continuous support by appointing him in various Government Committees.
In 2006, he was appointed as the member of Haryana Environment Protection Council, an advisory committee which advises the Ministry of Environment over various matters. In January 2007 he was appointed as the member of Debt Conciliation Board, Govt. of Haryana which takes care of the debts of poor people in Haryana.

Personal life
Naresh Kamboj married Samita Kamboj, a former member of Zila Parishad in 1985. They have two sons.

Positions held

Social views
Naresh Kamboj is a supporter and the follower of the Arya Samaj movement. He is a follower of the ideas and principles of Dayanand Saraswati. He has repeatedly shown concern about the position of Muslims in Haryana. He works with the Muslims of Yamuna Nagar for development and education of their children.

References

1964 births
Haryana politicians
Indian National Congress politicians
Kurukshetra University alumni
Living people
People from Yamunanagar district
Haryana district councillors